Chad Willett (born October 10, 1971 in British Columbia), is a Canadian actor and producer who has worked for over 30 years as a professional in film, television and theatre. His selected films include Alive, directed by Frank Marshall and produced by Kathleen Kennedy. Hector and the Search for Happiness, starring Simon Pegg, Monster Trucks directed by Chris Wedge., Broken Diamonds alongside Ben Platt and Lola Kirke and Steal This Movie with Vincent D'Onofrio

Willett produced and starred in the film Becoming Redwood in 2011. The film won the 2012 Vancouver International Film Festival Most Popular Canadian Film Award. In 2010, Willett received a Leo Award for his portrayal of the small town redneck antagonist in the film Cole, directed by Carl Bessai.

Career
In the CBS miniseries, Joan of Arc, Willett starred alongside Leelee Sobieski, Peter O’Toole, and Shirley MacLaine. In the CBS event movie, The Locket, he worked with Academy Award winner Vanessa Redgrave, as a young man caring for an aging lady in a nursing home.

Other notable television credits include series regular roles on The Chronicle, Jack & Jill, Charmed, Madison, and guest appearances on House M.D., Bones, NCIS, Human Target, The Secret Circle, Supernatural.

Willett's theatre credits include the Pulitzer Prize-winning play, Proof, at the Cleveland Play House and As Bees in Honey Drown, at the Pasadena Playhouse, the California state theatre.

Filmography
 Alive (1993)
 Madison (TV series) (1993—95)
 The X-Files (1994)
 The Outer Limits (1995 TV series) (1996)
 The Cape (1996 TV series) (1996—1997)
 Nothing Too Good for a Cowboy (1998)
 Dead Man's Gun (1998)
 Joan of Arc (1999) (miniseries)
 Jack & Jill (TV series) (1999—2000)
 Columbo (2000) 
 Charmed (TV series) (2001)
 The Chronicle (TV series) (2001—2002)
 The Locket (2002 film) (2002)
 NCIS (TV series) (2005)
 Carolina Moon (2007 film) (2007)
 House (TV series) (2007)
 Supernatural (American TV series) (2009)
 Bones (TV series) (2009)
 Cole (2009)
 Human Target (2010 TV series) (2010)
 For Christ's Sake (2010)
 Becoming Redwood (2012)
 The Secret Circle (TV series) (2012)
 Haven (TV series) (2012)
 When Calls the Heart (TV series) (2014)
 Motive (TV series) (2014)
 Hector and the Search for Happiness (2014)
 Monster Trucks (2017)
 Beyond (American TV series) (2017-2018)
 Colony (TV series) (2018)
 The Good Doctor (TV series) (2018)
 Broken Diamonds (2020)
 Big Sky (American TV series) (2021)

References

External links

Living people
Canadian male stage actors
Canadian male film actors
Canadian male television actors
Male actors from British Columbia
1971 births
21st-century Canadian male actors
20th-century Canadian male actors